Sabbath economics is an economic system championed by Christian theologian Ched Myers. The model is an application of the economic aspects of the Biblical Sabbath to modern socioeconomics. In the introduction of his book introducing this model, Myers states that "God's people are instructed to dismantle, on a regular basis, the fundamental patterns and structures of stratified wealth and power, so that there is 'enough for everyone.' " This statement contains two of the core principles of Myer's socioeconomic vision:
 The focus on voluntary redistribution of wealth
 A foundation of abundance as opposed to scarcity in other modern economic models.

The Biblical concepts from which Sabbath economics draws are:
 Sabbath day, particularly during the journey through the wilderness as described in Exodus 15-17
 Sabbath year, described in Exodus 23,  where the land was not cultivated, and Israelite slaves were released every seventh year
 Year of Jubilee every 50th year, when all debts were cancelled and all property returned to the original owners

Others have since sought to explore the ideas of a Sabbath economy in practical ways. Sabbath economics and related concepts of jubilee economics have also received attention from the liberation theology community, and other Christian thinkers who focus on social justice, gender equality and other humanitarian issues.

References 

Christian ethics
Christian radicalism
Christian terminology
Economic systems
Economy and Christianity
Sabbath